Korneyevka is a rural locality (a khutor) in Butyrskoye Rural Settlement, Repyovsky District, Voronezh Oblast, Russia. The population was 67 as of 2010.

Geography 
Korneyevka is located 11 km northwest of Repyovka (the district's administrative centre) by road. Zarosly is the nearest rural locality.

References 

Rural localities in Repyovsky District